The 2023 Los Angeles special election will be held on April 4, 2023 with a runoff on June 27, 2023 if necessary. Voters will elect a candidate in a nonpartisan primary, with runoff elections potentially scheduled. One of the fifteen seats on the Los Angeles City Council is up for election due to the vacancy of one member, councilwoman Nury Martinez of District 6, who resigned in the wake of the 2022 Los Angeles City Council scandal. Sharon Tso was installed as a caretaker to the district, but no formal appointment has been made. There is potential for a recall over Kevin de León's statements made during the 2022 Los Angeles City Council scandal as well. Former City Attorney Mike Feuer also proposed that a special election be held on a referendum to replace the Council's ability to redraw the City Council districts with an independent commission to redraw the districts before the 2024 elections.

Municipal elections in California are officially nonpartisan, and candidates' party affiliations do not appear on the ballot.

City Council District 6 

The 6th district includes the neighborhoods of Lake Balboa, Van Nuys, Panorama City, Arleta, North Hills, North Hollywood, and Sun Valley, as well as Van Nuys Airport and the Sepulveda Basin.

Although the election will be officially nonpartisan, all qualified candidates are members of the Democratic Party except Rose Grigoryan, who is registered as "no party preference."

Candidates

Declared 
 Marisa Alcaraz, deputy chief of staff to city councilor Curren Price from Lake Balboa
 Rose Grigoryan, marketing company founder from North Hollywood
 Isaac Kim, skin care business owner from Van Nuys
 Imelda Padilla, community relations manager and candidate for Los Angeles Unified School District Board of Education in 2017 from Sun Valley
 Marco Santana, housing nonprofit director and former Controller of the San Fernando Valley Democratic Party from Van Nuys
 Antoinette Scully, community organizer from Van Nuys
 Douglas Sierra, community center facilities coordinator from Sun Valley

Qualified write-in candidates 
 Wendy Goodman Thum, president of the Sun Valley Neighborhood Council
 Carmelina Minasova, respiratory therapist
 Richard Serrano, Los Angeles Department of Water and Power employee

Did not qualify 
 Lanira Murphy, treasurer of the Panorama City Neighborhood Council and runner-up for California State Assembly District 46 in 2020
 James Thomas, president of the San Fernando Valley NAACP

Declined 
 Angélica Dueñas, member of the Los Angeles County Democratic Party Central Committee, former president of the Sun Valley Neighborhood Council, and candidate for California's 29th congressional district in 2018, 2020, and 2022
Kelly Gonez, president of the Los Angeles Board of Education (endorsed Santana)
Cindy Montañez, San Fernando city councilor, former state assemblywoman from the 39th district, and candidate for this district in 2013 and 2015
Luz Rivas, state assemblywoman from the 39th district
Sharon Tso, Los Angeles Chief Legislative Analyst and nonvoting placeholder for this seat

Endorsements

Fundraising

Political positions

General election

City Council District 14

Polling 

Should Kevin de León be recalled?

Notes

References

External links 
Official campaign websites
 Marisa Alcaraz for City Council
 Rose Grigoryan for City Council
 Isaac Kim for City Council
 Carmelina Minasova for City Council
 Imelda Padilla for City Council
 Marco Santana for City Council
 Antoinette Scully for City Council
 Douglas Sierra for City Council

Local elections in California
Elections in Los Angeles
Los Angeles
Los Angeles